Dave Rimmer is a music journalist and critic who has written books and articles about a number of pop and rock artists. He wrote for Smash Hits and The Face in the 1980s, and wrote a book about 1980s pop entitled Like Punk Never Happened. His second book, Once Upon a Time in the East, is about Eastern Europe under Communism. His third book, New Romantics: The Look, was published in 2003 and is about the New Romantic era in 1980s pop, "from the moment Steve Strange and Rusty Egan began their legendary Bowie Nights at Billy's in Soho, through the move to Blitz, and the growth of the Birmingham scene."

References

English non-fiction writers
English music journalists
Living people
English male non-fiction writers
Year of birth missing (living people)